Nikolay Ivanovich Gnedich (– ) was a Ukrainian-born Russian poet and translator best known for his idyll The Fishers (1822). His translation of the Iliad (1807–29) is still the standard one.

Alexander Pushkin assessed Gnedich's Iliad as "a noble exploit worthy of Achilles" and addressed to him an epistle starting with lines "With Homer you conversed alone for days and nights..."

Pushkin also penned an epigram in Homeric hexameters, which unfavourably compares one-eyed Gnedich with the blind Greek poet:

He also wrote Don Corrado de Gerrera (1803), probably the first example of Russian Gothic fiction.

References

Bibliography
 

1784 births
1833 deaths
Writers from Poltava
Romantic poets
Poets from the Russian Empire
Male writers from the Russian Empire
Translators from the Russian Empire
Members of the Russian Academy
Burials at Tikhvin Cemetery
Imperial Moscow University alumni
Translators of Homer